This is a list of people elected Fellow of the Royal Society in 1948.

Fellows 

Thomas Edward Allibone
Frank Philip Bowden
Hayne Constant
Sir Richard Stafford Cripps
Stanley Fabes Dorey
Ernest Harold Farmer
Otto Robert Frisch
Sir John Claud Fortescue Fryer
Thomas Maxwell Harris
Walter Heinrich Heitler
Sir Alan Lloyd Hodgkin
George Martin Lees
Kurt Mahler
Sidnie Milana Manton
Robert Alexander McCance
Dorothy Mary Moyle Needham
James Herbert Orton
Sir Leonard Gregory Parsons
Stanley Peat
Gilbert Wooding Robinson
William Albert Hugh Rushton
John Walter Ryde
George Robert Sabine Snow
Edgar William Richard Steacie
John Arthur Todd
Frank Yates

Foreign members 

Detlev Wulf Bronk
Luitzen Egbertus Jan Brouwer
Maurice Jules Gaston Corneille Caullery
Linus Carl Pauling

1948
1948 in science
1948 in the United Kingdom